Isfahan University of Art (AUI) is a public University in Isfahan, Iran. It operated under the name of "Farabi University" before 1978, then it became a campus of the University of Art (based at Art University in Tehran). It was separated and became independent in 1999. The university owns some of the greatest houses in Isfahan, mostly of the Safavid period. The university's buildings are spread out over the city, most of which are old historic sites such as Tohid Khaane Building, David House, Martha Peters House, Haratian House, Sookiaas House, Haghighi House, France School and Ayyoubi and Melal House.

Faculties and Majors 
 Faculty of Preservation and Restoration 
Majors: Restoration of monuments, Restoration of historic buildings, Museum Management, Archeology
 Faculty of Architecture and Urban Planning 
Majors: Architecture, Urban Planning Engineering, Industrial Design, Architectural Studies, Urban Design, Islamic Urbanism, Islamic Architecture
 Faculty of Visual and Applied Arts
Majors: Painting, Graphic, Photography, Art Research, Music Composition
 Faculty of Art Religions and Civilizations 
Majors: Islamic Art, Art Research
C:Majors: Handicrafts, Carpet design, Writing and Painting
 Faculty of Art Entrepreneurship
Majors: Urban Economics, Economics of Art, Art Entrepreneurship, Tourism Management

External links
Official site

1974 establishments in Iran
Universities in Iran
Educational institutions established in 1974
Education in Isfahan
Universities in Isfahan Province
Buildings and structures in Isfahan